Paradox is the fourth studio album released by the Danish progressive metal band Royal Hunt. This is a concept album, with lyrics inspired by religion and divinity.

Track listing
All songs written by André Andersen except where noted.
 "The Awakening" – 1:39
 "River of Pain" – 7:14
 "Tearing Down the World" – 5:32
 "Message to God" – 6:41
 "Long Way Home" – 5:54
 "Time Will Tell" – 9:31
 "Silent Scream" – 6:13
 "It's Over" – 6:20
 "Martial Arts" (Instrumental)[Bonus Track] – 1:51
 "The Final Lullaby" [Bonus Track] – 4:01 (Steen Mogensen)
 "Restless" [Bonus Track] - 3:21

Personnel

D. C. Cooper – vocals
André Andersen – keyboards and guitars
  Steen Mogensen – bass guitar
  Jacob Kjaer – guitar
Allan Sørensen – drums
With
Maria McTurk – backing vocals
Lise Hansen – backing vocals
Kenny Lubcke – backing vocals

Production
Mixing – Lars H. Nissen and Royal Hunt

References

External links
Heavy Harmonies page

Royal Hunt albums
1997 albums
Concept albums
Magna Carta Records albums